A Message from the Country – The Jeff Lynne Years 1968/1973 is a compilation album featuring Jeff Lynne from his tenure with such bands as The Idle Race, The Move, and the Electric Light Orchestra.

Track listing

LP
 "Do Ya"  – The Move
 "The Minister"   – The Move
 "Girl at the Window"   – The Idle Race
 "Roll Over Beethoven"   – ELO
 "Words of Aaron"   – The Move
 "Mr. Radio"    – ELO
 "The Skeleton and the Roundabout"    – The Idle Race
 "Message from the Country"    – The Move
 "Come with Me"   – The Idle Race
 "Morning Sunshine"   – The Idle Race
 "10538 Overture"    – ELO
 "Happy Birthday / The Birthday"    – The Idle Race
 "No Time"   – The Move
 "Showdown"    – ELO

Additional CD tracks
 "In Old England Town"     – ELO
 "Big Chief Woolly Bosher"    – The Idle Race
 "Queen of the Hours"    – ELO
 "Follow Me Follow"   – The Idle Race

Notes

1989 compilation albums
Jeff Lynne albums
Albums produced by Roy Wood
Albums produced by Jeff Lynne
Albums produced by Eddy Offord
Harvest Records compilation albums